The Cummings Bridge in Ottawa, Ontario, Canada, crosses the Rideau River, connecting Rideau Street to Montreal Road in Vanier. It is a multi-span open spandrel arch bridge, constructed in 1921 and renovated in 1996.

History
The area east of the Cummings Bridge, later named Vanier was first linked to the Sandy Hill area of Ottawa with a wooden bridge erected in 1835, which went over Cummings Island in the Rideau River.  The Cummings family settled the island, had a store there, and the island and bridge there became associated with the Cummings name. In 1891, the old wooden bridge was replaced by a steel bridge, which the city wanted to name Bingham's Bridge, after Ottawa mayor Samuel Bingham, but this name never caught on.

Charles Cummings had a son, Robert Cummings who became Reeve of Gloucester Township and Warden of Carleton County, Ontario.

References

Bibliography

Bridges completed in 1921
Bridges in Ottawa
Concrete bridges in Canada
Open-spandrel deck arch bridges in Canada
Road bridges in Ontario
Truss bridges in Canada
1921 establishments in Ontario